Joymoti - the saviour is an Assamese biographical film directed by Manju Borah. It was released in the year 2006. Shooting of the film was done in Ketetong village at Margherita, Assam.Miao Arunachal Pradesh

Plot
The film is set in 17th-century Assam. The story is based on the life of Joymoti Konwari, a medieval Ahom princess of the Ahom dynasty who was tortured to death for not revealing the whereabouts of her husband Godapani and laid down her life for the sake of democracy.

Difference with Joymoti (1935 film)
In this film Manju Borah, differs the story from the first Assamese film Joymoti released on 10 March 1935. In the previous film by Jyoti Prasad Agarwala the sacrifice of Joymoti for her husband took major importance.

My objective is to present Joymoti as a historic figure. She was a visionary, who through sheer foresight and unflinching determination, saved the Ahom kingdom at a time when it was passing through one of its worst crisis, marked by grave political instability. Manju Borah

Cast and characters 
 Nita Basumatary as Joymoti
 Rohan Doley as Gadadhar Singha
 Bishnu Kharghoria as Atan Burhagohain
 Toufique Rahman as Laluksula Borphukon
 Pranjal Saikia as Lachit Borphukon

Achievements
 Screened at  37th International Film Festival of India (IFFI)
 Screened at Asian Film Festival
 Screened at Kolkata Film Festival.
 2021 - Formed part of India @75 at 52nd International Film Festival of India

See also
Cinema of Assam
National Film Award for Best Feature Film in Assamese

References

External links
 

Assamese-language films
2006 films
Indian biographical films
Films set in Assam
2000s biographical films
Films directed by Manju Borah
2000s Assamese-language films